Affiliated Foods is a grocery wholesaler. It was founded by the 1968 merger of South Plains Associated Grocers of Lubbock, Texas and the Panhandle Associated Grocers of Amarillo, Texas, and is a retailers' cooperative serving Texas, Oklahoma, Kansas, New Mexico, Colorado, Arizona, Nebraska, and Wyoming. Panhandle Associated Grocers was founded in 1946. The company has 700 member stores.

It owns the Tri-State Baking Company, and Veg-Pak brands.

External links 
 Affiliated Food Stores web site

American companies established in 1968
Retail companies established in 1968
Companies based in Amarillo, Texas
History of Lubbock, Texas
Economy of the Southwestern United States
Supermarkets of the United States
Retailers' cooperatives in the United States